Bishop Maksym Ryabukha, S.D.B. (born 18 May 1980) is a Ukrainian Greek Catholic hierarch as Titular Bishop of Stephaniacum and Auxiliary Bishop of the Archiepiscopal Exarchate of Donetsk since 19 September 2022.

Early life and formation
Bishop Ryabukha was born in Lviv and grew up as a parishioner of the local Salesian Church of Protection of the Mother of God. After graduation from the school education in Lviv, he joined a pre-novitiate of the Salesians Congregation in Obroshyne in 1997 and after a Salesian novitiate in Nave, Italy (1998–1999); he made a profession in 1999 and a solemn profession on 19 August 2005, simultaneously studying in the Salesian Pontifical University (1999–2001, 2003–2006). After returning to Ukraine, he was ordained as a deacon on 24 June 2006 and as a priest on 4 August 2007. Both ordinations were made by Bishop Andrés Sapelak, S.D.B. in the Church of Protection of the Mother of God in Lviv.

Educational and pastoral career
Fr. Ryabukha served in the different local Salesian communities, working as a youth leader and in 2013 was sent to Kyiv to make a Salesian fundation in the capital and in 2018 became its first superior. At the same time he studied at the Interregional Academy of Personnel Management with specialist in law degree (2008–2011), Lviv Polytechnic with master's degree in educational institution management (2011–2012) and Vasyl Stefanyk Precarpathian National University with master's degree in social pedagogy (2012–2015). Also he worked as a lecturer in the Three Saint Hierarchs Major Theological Seminary in Kyiv (2013–2022).

From February 2016 to July 2018, he worked in the Apostolic Nunciature to Ukraine, acting as a translator of the Apostolic Nuncio in Ukraine.

Bishop
On 19 September 2022, he was confirmed by Pope Francis as an Auxiliary Bishop of the Archiepiscopal Exarchate of Donetsk and appointed as a Titular Bishop of Stephaniacum. He was consecrated as a bishop by Major Archbishop Sviatoslav Shevchuk and co-consecrators: bishop Stepan Meniok and bishop Yosyf Milyan in the Cathedral of the Resurrection of Christ in Kyiv on 22 December 2022.

References

1980 births
Living people
Clergy from Lviv
Lviv Polytechnic alumni
Salesian Pontifical University alumni
Interregional Academy of Personnel Management alumni
Vasyl Stefanyk Subcarpathian National University alumni
Ukrainian Eastern Catholics
Salesian bishops
Bishops of the Ukrainian Greek Catholic Church